Quiabaya Municipality is the fourth municipal section of the Larecaja Province in the  La Paz Department, Bolivia. Its seat is Quiabaya.

Languages 
The languages spoken in the Quiabaya Municipality are mainly Aymara and Spanish.  

Ref.: obd.descentralizacion.gov.bo

See also 
 Achachi Qala
 Saywani
 Tawqani

References 
 www.ine.gob.bo / census 2001: Quiabaya Municipality

External links 
 Old map of Larecaja Province (showing its previous political division)

Municipalities of La Paz Department (Bolivia)